Ebenezer Dadzie (born 1 June 1975) is a retired Ghanaian football striker.

He played for Goldfields Obuasi in Ghana, and was capped for Ghana. He was a squad member in the 1997 Korea Cup.

References

External links

1975 births
Living people
Ghanaian footballers
Ashanti Gold SC players
Ghana international footballers
Association football forwards
Place of birth missing (living people)
20th-century Ghanaian people